Mayabazar is a 2008 Malayalam film by Thomas Sebastian with Mammootty in the lead role. The film received negative reviews.

Plot 
 
Maya Bazaar is in a village called Mayannoor where people buy salvaged vehicles for their parts. Rameshan is a leading man of the bazaar. With the money he earns, he feeds patients at the local hospital. A young woman who lives in Maya Bazaar called Maya loves Rameshan, but Rameshan does not have any feelings for her. Rameshan has a rival gang led by Bhadran and Bhadran wants to marry Maya.

One day Rameshan happens to see the body of a person killed in a road accident. The person looks exactly like him, and his name is Lakshmi Narayanan. The rest of the movie is about the mystery associated with the dead man.

Cast

Soundtrack
 "Mizhiyil Mizhiyil" - Sujatha Mohan, Sreenivas, Rahul Raj
 "Jiliu Jillu Nee" - Vineeth Sreenivasan, Cicily, Sayanora Philip
 "Mizhiyil Mizhiyil" (F) - Sujatha Mohan

Release
The film was released on 4 October 2008 and became an average grosser. Later the film was dubbed in Telugu under the title Nenunnanu.

References

External links
 

2008 films
2000s Malayalam-language films
Films shot in Thrissur
Films scored by Rahul Raj